This is a list of Danish football transfers for summer 2015, only the Danish Superliga is included

Danish Superliga

AaB

In:

Out:

AGF

In:

Out:

Brøndby IF

In:

Out:

Esbjerg fB

In:

Out:

FC Copenhagen

In:

Out:

FC Midtjylland

In:

Out:

FC Nordsjælland

In:

Out:

Hobro IK

In:

Out:

OB

In:

Out:

Randers FC

In:

Out:

SønderjyskE

In:

Out:

Viborg FF

In:

Out:

References

Denmark
Transfers
Transfers
2015